Ephialtias draconis is a moth of the family Notodontidae first described by Herbert Druce in 1885. It is found in Panama, and has been recorded from southeastern Peru and northern Bolivia, with few intervening specimens from Colombia or Ecuador.

Larvae have been recorded on Turnera species.

External links
"Ephialtias draconis (Druce 1885)". Tree of Life Web Project. Retrieved December 28, 2019.

Notodontidae of South America
Moths described in 1885